Gymnastics at the 2017 European Youth Summer Olympic Festival took place from 23 July to 30 July in Győr, Hungary in the Radnóti Street Sport Centre.

Medal summary

Medal table

Overall

Boys

Girls

Medals events

Boys

Girls

References

External links

 European Union of Gymnastics

European Youth Summer Olympic Festival
2017 European Youth Summer Olympic Festival
2017
International gymnastics competitions hosted by Hungary